Orthostoma vittata is a species of beetle in the family Cerambycidae. It was described by Per Olof Christopher Aurivillius in 1910.

References

Compsocerini
Beetles described in 1910